Palais de danse is a 1928 British silent drama film directed by Maurice Elvey and starring Mabel Poulton, John Longden and Robin Irvine.

Cast
 Mabel Poulton as No. 16 
 John Longden as No. 1 
 Robin Irvine as Tony King 
 Hilda Moore as Lady King 
 Chili Bouchier as No. 2 
 Jerrold Robertshaw as Sir William King

References

Bibliography
 Low, Rachel. The History of British Film: Volume IV, 1918–1929. Routledge, 1997.

External links

1928 films
British drama films
British silent feature films
1928 drama films
1920s English-language films
Films directed by Maurice Elvey
Films shot at Lime Grove Studios
British black-and-white films
1920s British films
Silent drama films